The 2016–17 Brown Bears women's basketball team will represent Brown University during the 2016–17 NCAA Division I women's basketball season. The Bears, led by third year head coach Sarah Behn, play their home games at the Pizzitola Sports Center and were members of the Ivy League. They finished the season 17–13, 7–7 in Ivy League play to finish in a tie for fourth place. They lost in the semifinals of the Ivy women's tournament to Penn. They were invited to the Women's Basketball Invitational where defeated UMBC in the first round before losing in the quarterfinals to UNC Greensboro.

Ivy League changes
This season, the Ivy League will institute conference postseason tournaments. The tournaments will only award the Ivy League automatic bids for the NCAA Division I Men's and Women's Basketball Tournaments; the official conference championships will continue to be awarded based solely on regular-season results. The Ivy League playoff will take place March 11 and 12 at the Palestra in Philadelphia. There will be two semifinal games on the first day with the No. 1 seed playing the No. 4 seed and the No. 2 seed playing the No. 3 seed. The final will be played the next day for the NCAA bid.

Roster

Schedule

|-
!colspan=9 style="background:#321414; color:#FFFFFF;"| Non-conference regular season

|-
!colspan=9 style="background:#321414; color:#FFFFFF;"| Ivy League regular season

|-
!colspan=9 style="background:#321414; color:#FFFFFF;"| Ivy League Women's tournament

|-
!colspan=9 style="background:#321414; color:#FFFFFF;"| WBI

References

See also
 2016–17 Brown Bears men's basketball team

Brown Bears women's basketball seasons
Brown
Brown
2016 in sports in Rhode Island
2017 in sports in Rhode Island